Elytropus is a genus of flowering plants in the family Apocynaceae, first described as a genus in 1860. It contains only one known species, Elytropus chilensis, native to Chile and to Rio Negro Province in Argentina.

formerly included
 Elytropus pubescens (Wall. ex G.Don) Miers = Holarrhena pubescens Wall. ex G.Don
 Elytropus spectabilis (Stadelm.) Miers = Macropharynx spectabilis (Stadelm.) Woodson

References

Odontadenieae
Flora of South America
Monotypic Apocynaceae genera